Gianni Usvardi (6 May 1930 – 21 May 2008) was an Italian politician who served as Deputy (1963–1972) and Mayor of Mantua (1973–1985).

References

1930 births
2008 deaths
Mayors of Mantua
Deputies of Legislature IV of Italy
Deputies of Legislature V of Italy
20th-century Italian politicians
Italian Socialist Party politicians